is a Nankai Electric Railway and Osaka Metro Sakaisuji Line railway station and metro station in Nishinari-ku, Osaka. It is the terminal station of the southern end of the Sakaisuji Line.  All trains of the Nankai Main Line and the Kōya Line of Nankai Electric Railway stop at Tengachaya.

Lines
Nankai Electric Railway (NK05)
Nankai Main Line
Kōya Line
Osaka Metro Sakaisuji Line (K20)

Layout

Nankai Railway

The station is elevated and has been the interchange station between the Nankai Line and the Koya Line since March 24, 2001. It has an island platform serving 2 tracks and is between two side platforms serving a track each. The island platform allows for cross-platform interchange from the Koya Line Namba-bound trains to the Nankai Line Wakayamashi-bound and Kansai Airport-bound trains (and vice versa).

Osaka Metro Sakaisuji Line

The station on the Sakaisuji Line is located under the station on Nankai Railway, and was constructed together with the elevation of the Nankai Railway lines. An island platform serving 2 tracks and a side platform serving a track are located on the first basement. The side platform is used as the arrival platform.

Adjacent stations

|-
!colspan=5|Nankai Electric Railway (NK05)

|-
!colspan=5|Osaka Metro

External links
  Tengachaya Station from Nankai Electric Railway website
  Tengachaya Station from Osaka Metro website
  Tengachaya Station from Osaka Metro website

Railway stations in Japan opened in 1885
Railway stations in Japan opened in 1993
Railway stations in Osaka Prefecture
Osaka Metro stations